Jake Hamilton (born January 18, 1988) is an American entertainment reporter, film critic, and documentary producer. Formerly a teen film critic for the Houston Chronicle he is now the lead Entertainment Anchor for Good Day Chicago.

Hamilton was named "one of the nation's top show business journalists" by Forbes.

Hamilton is a member of the Broadcast Film Critics Association.

Career
Hamilton began his career as a film critic in print at the age of 14, writing for the Houston Chronicle in 2002 while still attending Seabrook Intermediate School. While writing for the Chronicle, Hamilton was criticized for his inclusion of R-rated films in his "Top 10 Films of the Year" lists. He continued with the Houston Chronicle until he graduated from Clear Lake High School (Houston, Texas) in 2006.

Later in 2006, Hamilton, 18, was brought on as the film critic for the late night talk show, The After Party, hosted by Ernie Manouse. The show received positive reviews from both critics and audiences alike, and was nominated for a "Best Entertainment/Variety program" Emmy in its first season. The program ended its run after over 50 episodes on November 15, 2006.

After The After Party ended, Ernie Manouse brought on Hamilton to help produce the HoustonPBS documentary, The Last 24. Covering the last 24 hours before the opening of a contemporary dance company's latest production, the documentary was met with critical praise when in aired in August 2007. The Last 24 would eventually garner Hamilton, 20, an Emmy nomination in September 2008.

In 2008, Hamilton began hosting the film review segment Jake's Takes on KHOU-TV (CBS Houston). Reviewing films, covering international film festivals and interviewing celebrities like Tom Cruise, Meryl Streep, and Will Smith. Jake's Takes, was nominated for "Outstanding Achievement In Cinema" by the Houston Film Critic Society in 2008 for "bringing celebrities back to Houston."

In 2009, Hamilton moved "Jake's Takes" from the local CBS affiliate (KHOU-TV) to the local FOX affiliate (KRIV).

In 2012, Hamilton won the Los Angeles Press Club's National Entertainment Journalism Award by for hosting "Jake's Takes."  

In 2013, Hamilton joined WFLD-TV (FOX Chicago) Good Day Chicago, where he is now the lead Entertainment Anchor.

In 2021, he was named "one of the nation's top show business journalists" by Forbes.

To date, Hamilton has over 100,000 subscribers to his YouTube channel "Jake's Takes," and has earned ten Emmy nominations for his work—of the ten nominations, he's won two.

References

1988 births
Living people
American film critics
American television talk show hosts
American columnists
Journalists from Houston
Houston Chronicle people
American male journalists